LGF may refer to:

 The Lesbian & Gay Foundation, a British charity
 the NYSE stock ticker symbol for Lionsgate
 the FAA location identifier for Laguna Army Airfield, a military airport located at Yuma Proving Ground, Arizona, United States
 Little Green Footballs, an American political blog
 Longfield railway station, Kent, National Rail station code
 Lionsgate Films, the film studio division of Lionsgate